In the 2009 Guinea mine collapse in May 2009, a cave-in at a gold mine in Siguiri, Guinea, killed 20 people, injured five and left ten missing.

References

History of Guinea
Guinea Mine Collapse, 2009
Guinea Mine Collapse, 2009